The Nokia Talkman 510 is a brick phone which is discontinued.

Talkman 510